The Jerusalem Trail,  (Shvil Yerushalaim) is a hiking and cycling path that extends the Israel National Trail into Jerusalem.

Overview
The trail, opened to the public in 2006,  is almost a complete circuit. It  can be extended to a full loop by following Israel National Trail marks. The length is approximately 42 km (26mi). 

The trail is marked with a gold line between two blue lines and takes an average of two days to complete.  

The trail combines cultural and historical places with national parks around Jerusalem.  The trail passes many museums, the Knesset, the City of David, Mahane Yehuda Market, Sataf, and the Hebrew University of Jerusalem.

See also
Tourism in Israel
Kerem Tunnel
Geography of Israel
List of long-distance footpaths
Wildlife in Israel

References

External links
 The trail on Google Maps
 Trail Section & Maps

2006 establishments in Israel
Hiking trails in Israel
Geography of Jerusalem
Transport in Jerusalem
Tourist attractions in Jerusalem
Cycling in Israel